The 2023 National Amateur Cup is the 99th edition of the National Amateur Cup, a knockout cup competition open to amateur teams affiliated with the United States Adult Soccer Association (USASA). It will be the fifth edition of the tournament to award its champion a spot in the U.S. Open Cup.

Bavarian United SC are the defending National Amateur Cup champion. It is currently unknown if the team will compete in the USASA Region II tournament.

Format 
All four regions of the USASA will hold amateur cup tournaments to crown champions, which would then qualify for the final tournament. Qualification for these tournaments is determined individually by each region. The final four teams then compete in a single location knockout tournament to crown a national champion, with an additional game in place to determine both third and fourth place.

Region I 
Nine state associations in USASA Region I sent representatives to the tournament for the Fritz Marth Amateur Cup. The final of the regional tournament will take place on June 17 at the Ukrainian American Sports Center in North Wales, Pennsylvania.

First round

Bracket

Home teams listed on top of bracket

Bold = winner
* = after extra time, = penalty shootout score

Region II 
Details regarding the Bill Davey Amateur Cup, including the number of teams competing, have not been finalized. Registration is currently open for amateur teams within the 14 state associations within USASA Region II. Teams from the National Premier Soccer League, US Club Soccer, American Youth Soccer Organization, and Elite Development Program (EDP) may also enter if certain criteria are met.

Teams win $300 for every knockout round game they win. An additional prize of $1,000 goes to the regional champion.

The final of the regional tournament is scheduled to take place on July 8. The location of the match as not been announced at this time.

Region III 
Details regarding the USASA Region III tournament, including the number of teams competing, have not been finalized.

Region IV 
Details regarding the USASA Region IV tournament, including the number of teams competing, have not been finalized.

National Amateur Cup Finals 
The national finals are scheduled to be held between August 5 and 6. The location and final prize money amount of the tournament has not been announced.

References 

National Amateur Cup
National Amateur Cup
2023